Standard Chartered Nepal (officially Standard Chartered Bank Nepal Limited) is a banking and financial services company in Nepal and a subsidiary of Standard Chartered PLC.

History
It was established on 30 January 1987.

References

Banks of Nepal
Banks established in 1987
Nepal
Nepalese subsidiaries of foreign companies
1987 establishments in Nepal